Doryopteris angelica is a rare fern species, known by the common name Kauai digit fern. It is endemic to Hawaii where only small populations are known.

The ferns grow on slopes in Hawaiian tropical rainforests habitat, and have been found only on the island of Kauai.  It was federally listed as an endangered species in 2010.

Taxonomy
Doryopteris angelica is closely related to Doryopteris decora, and was first described as a separate species in 1999.  It is now placed in the Cheilanthoideae subfamily of the Pteridaceae.

References

External links
USDA Plants Profile for Doryopteris angelica (Kauai digit fern)
Isotype: Doryopteris angelica

angelica
Endemic flora of Hawaii
Native ferns of Hawaii
Biota of Kauai
Plants described in 1999
Critically endangered flora of the United States